The Grant Avenue station was a station on the demolished BMT Fulton Street Line in Brooklyn, New York City. It had two tracks and one island platform. The station opened on July 16, 1894 as City Line station, and was the eastern terminal of the line until September 25, 1915, when Hudson Street – 80th Street opened and the line was extended to Lefferts Avenue – 119th Street. The next stop to the west was Crescent Street. It closed on April 26, 1956, and was replaced by the nearby underground Grant Avenue station of the IND Fulton Street Line 1½ blocks south on April 29, 1956. The remainder of the line east to Lefferts Avenue (today Lefferts Boulevard) was connected to the Fulton Street subway and continues to operate.

References

External links
Grant Avenue Elevated Station; BMT Fulton Street Line (NYCSubway.org)

Defunct BMT Fulton Street Line stations
Railway stations in the United States opened in 1894
Railway stations closed in 1956
Former elevated and subway stations in Brooklyn
1894 establishments in New York (state)
1956 disestablishments in New York (state)